With the growing worldwide popularity of mixed martial arts (MMA) as an athletic sport, numerous MMA films have come to theaters, television, and DVDs.

The following is a list of live action MMA films where at least one character or martial artist fights in the MMA style or MMA is the central theme. For example, plot of the film may deal with cage fighting, a mixed martial arts competition, or martial artists fighting in different styles.

Early films (1980-2000)

Films listed in order by year of release
Last Man Standing (1988) (also released in Canada) - William Sanderson, Michael Copeman
Bloodsport (1988) - Jean-Claude Van Damme, Bolo Yeung, Forest Whitaker, Donald Gibb
Ring of Fire II: Blood and Steel (1993) - Don "The Dragon" Wilson, Ron Yuan, Maria Ford, Shari Shattuck, Vince Murdocco
Bloodsport II: The Next Kumite (1996) - Daniel Bernhardt, John Rhys-Davies, Pat Morita, James Hong, Gerald Okamura
Bloodsport III (1997) - Daniel Bernhardt, John Rhys-Davies, Pat Morita, Donald Gibb, Philip Tan
Bloodsport 4: The Dark Kumite (1999) - Daniel Bernhardt, Ivan Ivanov, Michael Krawk
Lionheart (1990) - Jean-Claude Van Damme, Brian Thompson, Billy Blanks
Street Fighter (1994) - Jean-Claude Van Damme, Raúl Juliá, Kylie Minogue, Damian Chapa
WMAC Masters (1995) (TV series) - Shannon Lee, Herb Perez, Hakim Alston, Ho-Sung Pak, Hoyoung Pak, Jamie Webster, Chris Casamassa, Johnny Lee Smith, Larry Lam
Mortal Kombat (1995) - Christopher Lambert, Robin Shou, Linden Ashby, Bridgette Wilson, Chris Casamassa, Talisa Soto, Cary-Hiroyuki Tagawa, Trevor Goddard
The Quest (1996) - Jean-Claude Van Damme, Roger Moore, Louis Mandylor, James Remar
Mortal Kombat: Annihilation (1997) - Robin Shou, Talisa Soto, Brian Thompson, James Remar, Sandra Hess, Chris Conrad, Litefoot, Lynn "Red" Williams
Mortal Kombat: Konquest (1998) (TV series) - Daniel Bernhardt, Paolo Montalbán, Tracey Douglas, Kristanna Loken, Jefferey Meek, Bruce Locke
Champions (1998) - Louis Mandylor, Danny Trejo, Ken Shamrock
Choke (1999) (documentary) - Rickson Gracie, Royler Gracie
Fight Club (1999) - Brad Pitt, Edward Norton, Helena Bonham Carter, Meat Loaf

American films

Films listed in alphabetical order
Arena (2011) - Kellan Lutz, Samuel L. Jackson, Daniel Dae Kim, Johnny Messner, Derek Mears, Katia Winter, Nina Dobrev 
Bare Knuckles (2010) (DVD) - Martin Kove, Jeanette Roxborough, Louis Mandylor, Chris Mulkey
Beatdown (2010) (video/DVD) - Rudy Youngblood, Eric Balfour, Danny Trejo, Michael Bisping, Heath Herring, Bobby Lashley, Mike Swick
Beyond the Ring (2008) - André Lima, Martin Kove, Gary Busey, Justice Smith
Blizhiny Boy: The Ultimate Fighter (2007) (also released in Russia) - Martin Kove, Bolo Yeung, Gary Busey, Cung Le, David Carradine, Eric Roberts
Blood and Bone (2008) - Michael Jai White, Julian Sands, Kevin "Kimbo Slice" Ferguson, Eamonn Walker, Gina Carano, Jesse Smith, Jr.
Cage Fighter (2011) (documentary) - Eric Schambari, Urijah Faber, Jens Pulver, Brian Bowles, Charlie Valencia, Doug Marshall, Alex Karalexis, Jeff Curran, Paulo Filho
Caged In (2011)
Circle of Pain (2010) (video/DVD) - Dean Cain, Bai Ling, Roger Huerta, Kevin "Kimbo Slice" Ferguson, Heath Herring, Frank Mir, Tony Schiena
Cradle 2 the Grave (2003) - Jet Li, DMX, Kelly Hu, Mark Dacascos, Tito Ortiz, Chuck Liddell, Randy Couture
Damage (2009)-  "Stone Cold" Steve Austin, Walter Gooins, Laura Vandervoort
Death Warrior (2008) - Héctor Echavarría, Nick Nolte, Garret Soto, George St-Pierre, Anderson Silva, Quinton "Rampage" Jackson, Jesse Smith, Jr.
DOA: Dead or Alive (2006) - Jaime Pressly, Devon Aoki, Eric Roberts, Kane Kosugi, Kevin Nash 
Fighting (2009) - Channing Tatum, Terrence Howard, Cung Le
The Hammer (2010) - Russell Harvard, Raymond J. Barry, Rich Franklin, Matt Hamill (stunts) 
Haywire (2011) - Gina Carano, Ewan McGregor, Channing Tatum, Michael Angarano, Antonio Banderas, Michael Douglas
Hell's Chain (2009) - Héctor Echavarría, Heath Herring, Quinton "Rampage" Jackson, Frank Mir, Antônio Rodrigo Nogueira, Georges St-Pierre, Anderson Silva
Here Comes the Boom (2012) - Kevin James, Henry Winkler, Salma Hayek
Honor (2006) - Jason Barry, Russell Wong, Roddy Piper, Don Frye, Malaipet, Rener Gracie, Rorion Gracie
Locked Down (2010) - Vinnie Jones, Tony Schiena, Bai Ling, Kevin "Kimbo Slice" Ferguson, Rashad Evans, Cheick Kongo, Forrest Griffin
Maximum Cage Fighting (2006) (video-DVD) - André Lima, Jun Chong, Jason Field, Renzo Gracie, Oliva Briggs
Never Back Down (2008) - Sean Faris, Cam Gigandet, Djimon Hounsou
Never Back Down 2 (2011) (video/DVD) - Michael Jai White, Evan Peters, Alex Meraz, Dean Geyer, Todd Duffee
Never Submit (2009) (also released in Canada) - Corey Sevier, Ken Shamrock, Nate Quarry, Mike Swick
Never Surrender (2009) - Héctor Echavarría, B.J. Penn, George St-Pierre, Anderson Silva
New York Mixed Martial Arts (2011) (documentary) -  Josh Barnett, Bas Rutten, Michael Straka, Dana White
No Rules (2005) - Gary Busey, Randy Couture, Don Frye, Jessie Avila
Once I Was a Champion (2011) (documentary) - Evan Tanner, Randy Couture, Rich Franklin, Forrest Griffin, Bas Rutten, Chael Sonnen, Dana White
The Philly Kid (2012) - Wes Chatham, Devon Sawa, Sarah Butler, Neal McDonough, Michael Jai White, Rich Clementi 
The Red Canvas (2008) Ernie Reyes, Sr., Ernie Reyes, Jr., Lee Reyes, Frank Shamrock, Shonie Carter, Chris Casamassa
Redbelt (2008) - Chiwetel Ejiofor, Alice Braga, Jose Pablo Cantillo, Randy Couture
Redemption (2011) - Louis Gossett Jr., Omari Hardwick, Tzi Ma, B.J. Penn, Frank Mir, Stephan Bonnar, Big John McCarthy
Ring of Death (2008) (TV movie) - Johnny Messner, Stacy Keach
Street Warrior (2008) (TV movie) - Max Martini, Nick Chinlund, Max Perlich, Danny Arroyo
Supreme Champion (2010) (DVD) - Daniel Berhardt, Stephan Bonnar, Leila Arcieri
Tekken (2010) - Jon Foo, Kelly Overton, Cung Le, Ian Anthony Dale, Luke Gross, Roger Huerta
Ten Dead Men (2007) (also released in UK) - Brendan Carr, Terry Stone, Kimo Leopoldo, Dave Legeno
Ultimate Champions (2008) - Daniel Bernhardt, Stephan Bonnar, Neal "Xingu" Rodil
Undisputed II: Last Man Standing (2006) - Michael Jai White, Scott Adkins, Ben Cross
Undisputed III: Redemption (aka Undisputed 3) (2009) - Scott Adkins, Mykel Shannon Jenkins, Ilram Choi
Unleashed (2005) (also released in France and UK as Danny the Dog) - Jet Li, Morgan Freeman, Bob Hoskins
Unrivaled (2010) - Héctor Echavarría, Rashad Evans, Forrest Griffin, Heath Herring, Keith Jardine, Lyoto Machida
Warrior (2011) - Tom Hardy, Nick Nolte, Joel Edgerton, Jake McLaughlin, Rich Clementi

Other films

Black Salt (2010) (Anime) (Turkey)
Flash Point (2007) (aka City Without Mercy) (Hong Kong) - Donnie Yen, Collin Chou, Louis Koo
The Kumite (2003) (aka Star Runner/Sin nin a Fu) (Hong Kong/South Korea) - Vanness Wu, Hyun-Joo Kim, Andy On
Nagurimono: The Fighter (2005) (Japan) - Kazushi Sakuraba, Hiroshi Tamaki, Takanri Jinnai, Quinton "Rampage" Jackson, Don Frye, Wanderlei Silva
The Tournament (2008) (UK) - Scott Adkins, Kelly Hu, Ving Rhames
 Rust and Bone (2012) (France/Belgium) - Matthias Schoenaerts
 Brothers (2015) (India) - Akshay Kumar, Siddharth Malhotra, Jackie Shroff

See also
 List of martial arts films
 List of ninja films
 Samurai cinema

References

External links

Mixed martial arts

Mixed martial arts lists